Cyananthus is a genus of flowering plants that consists of about 30 species of annual or mostly perennial herbs from high mountains of Central and East Asia. They are little Himalayan plants no higher than 4 in. The name comes from the Greek word for blue flowers. Leaves are usually small and simple, sometimes narrowing to base, tooth-lobed at summit. In August to September, the plants bear showy of bright purplish-blue, yellow or white, funnel to bell-shaped, 5-lobed flowers 1 in in diameter with stamens free from the corolla and hairy throat. The flowers are borne singly on stalks. They always lose the aerial parts during the coldest months, and as spring begins, stems and leaves quickly start to reproduce.

Species
Cyananthus chungtienensis
Cyananthus cordifolius
Cyananthus cronquistii
Cyananthus delavayi
Cyananthus flavus
Cyananthus formosus
Cyananthus hayanus
Cyananthus himalaicus
Cyananthus hookeri
Cyananthus incanus syn. Cyananthus incanus var. leiocalyx, Cyananthus leiocalyx
C. incanus subsp. incanus
C. incanus subsp. orientalis
Cyananthus inflatus
Cyananthus lichiangensis
Cyananthus lobatus
Cyanantbus longiflorus
Cyananthus macrocalyx
Cyananthus microphyllus syn. Cyananthus nepalensis, Cyananthus linifolius
C. microphyllus subsp. williamsonii
Cyananthus pedunculatus syn. Cyananthus pedunculatus var. crenatus
Cyananthus spathifolius

References

Botanica Sistematica

Campanuloideae
Campanulaceae genera
Flora of China
Flora of the Indian subcontinent